The Germany national football team ( or Die Mannschaft) has represented Germany in men's international football since 1908. The team is governed by the German Football Association (Deutscher Fußball-Bund), founded in 1900. Ever since the DFB was reinaugurated in 1949 the team has represented the Federal Republic of Germany. Under Allied occupation and division, two other separate national teams were also recognised by FIFA: the Saarland team representing the Saarland (1950–1956) and the East German team representing the German Democratic Republic (1952–1990). Both have been absorbed along with their records by the current national team. The official name and code "Germany FR (FRG)" was shortened to "Germany (GER)" following the reunification in 1990.

Germany is one of the most successful national teams in international competitions, having won four World Cups (1954, 1974, 1990, 2014), three European Championships (1972, 1980, 1996), and one Confederations Cup (2017). They have also been runners-up three times in the European Championships, four times in the World Cup, and a further four third-place finishes at World Cups. East Germany won Olympic Gold in 1976.

Germany is the only nation to have won both the FIFA World Cup and the FIFA Women's World Cup. At the end of the 2014 World Cup, Germany earned the highest Elo rating of any national football team in history, with a record 2,205 points. Germany is also the only European nation that has won a FIFA World Cup in the Americas.

Abbreviation 
 A = away match
 H = home match
 * = match in neutral place
 (c) = captain of team
 (g) = goalkeeper
 Am. = Amateure
 WC = World Cup
 EC = European Championship
 Confed-Cup = Confederations Cup
 NL = UEFA Nations League
 OG = Olympic matches
 Cons. tour. = Consolation tournament of the Olympic Games
 a.e.t. = after extra time
 p. = penalty shoot-out
 GG = golden goal
  = goal scored from penalty kick
  = own goal
  (opposite the name) = players which are played for Austria and Germany
  (opposite the name) = players which are played for Poland and Germany
 green background colour = Germany won the match
 yellow background colur = draw (including matches decided via penalty shoot-out)
 red background colour = Germany lost the match
 The current and enlarged national team members are highlighted in bold. Players who have not been played for more than six months are in italics.

Player records

Most capped players

Most consecutive matches 
Since many players have been absent due to injuries, there are only a few players who have been able to play for the national team without interruption:

Youngest players on debut 
Twelve players were younger than 19 on their debut, four under 18. 109 players were not yet of age on their debut. After the age of majority was reduced to 18 years on 1 January 1975, no players who were not yet of age have made their debut, with the exception of Youssoufa Moukoko in 2022, who debuted four days before his 18th birthday. Of the players who were not yet of age on their debut, only Franz Beckenbauer managed more than 100 internationals, but other players later became World and / or European Champions, who were not yet of age on their debut: Rainer Bonhof, Paul Breitner, Horst Eckel, Uli Hoeneß, Gerd Mueller, Wolfgang Overath, Berti Vogts, Fritz Walter. Besides Beckenbauer, Willy Baumgärtner, Paul Janes and Uwe Seeler later became record appearances.

The ten youngest players on debut are listed.

Oldest players 
Eighteen players played their last match for Germany at an age older than 35 years, including six goalkeepers. Eight national players continued to play for Austria or the Saarland after the Second World War.
The ten oldest players at their last match are listed.

Oldest players on debut 
38 players were at least 30 years old on their debut; for fifteen of them it was their only match. Stefan Kuntz, who had made his debut at the age of 31 years and 49 days, made the most appearances (25). They all played in friendly matches for their first match. The ten oldest players on debut are listed.

Youngest captains 
Of the ten youngest captains, only Joshua Kimmich was captain in a competitive match, playing against Cameroon in the 2017 FIFA Confederations Cup group stage; the other thirteen youngest captains were only in friendly matches.

Oldest captains (first matches as captains) 
Of the ten oldest captains, only Marco Reus was captain for the first time in a competitive match, in a win against Liechtenstein for 2022 FIFA World Cup qualification after Germany had already qualified; all the other players only debuted as captain in friendly matches.

List of national players who were not born in Germany or Austria

Goals

Top goalscorers

Youngest goalscorers 
Ten goalscorers were younger than 20. Lukas Podolski is the youngest player to score two goals in one match, doing so in his eighth match. By contrast, Fritz Walter was the youngest player to score three goals, doing so in his first international match. Jamal Musiala is the youngest competitive goalscorer as well as the youngest player to score his first goal in a competitive fixture, doing so at the age of 18 years and 227 days in a 2022 FIFA World Cup qualifier against North Macedonia; all of the other nine youngest goalscorers scored in friendly matches.

The following table lists the ten youngest goalscorers.

Oldest goalscorers 
Seventeen players were over the age of 33 when they scored their last goal, including record goalscorer Miroslav Klose, who also scored the most goals after his 30th birthday. His precursor Gerd Müller scored his last of 68 international goals aged 28 years and 246 days, making him the player with the most goals before his 30th birthday. Klose was 35 years and 362 days old when he scored 69th international goal, the one which saw him replace Müller as the record scorer.

The following table lists the ten oldest goalscorers.

Hat-tricks 

For several players with the same number of hat-tricks and total goals, the entry is made chronologically.

Best goal ratio 
Gottfried Fuchs is the only player with a ratio of more than two goals per match.

Penalties 
As of 9 September 2019, 128 penalties have been given for Germany in 124 different matches. Of these, 102 were converted (80%). The first penalty was in Germany's second match to make the score 1–1 (the final score was 1–5). In two cases, Germany scored two penalties in a single match, and on each occasion both penalties were converted by the same player (Fritz Walter in the 1954 World Cup semi-finals and Bastian Schweinsteiger in a friendly). On two occasions did the same player (Torsten Frings and Lukas Podolski) successfully convert one penalty but miss another in the same match.

The most frequent penalty taker for Germany was Michael Ballack, converting ten of eleven penalties taken. The most penalty misses recorded was by Jürgen Klinsmann, who could not convert three of six penalties taken. 28 penalties were converted by the captain (c) of the team, with Lothar Matthäus (seven times) converting the most penalties as captain.

Germany have received the most penalties against Bulgaria; they earned nine penalties in a total of 21 matches against the side (42% of matches), of which eight were converted. Germany have received six penalties against a reigning world champion, all of which were converted. Germany have also received thirteen penalties as reigning world champions, of which ten were converted.

In fifteen matches, the conversion of the penalty was decisive to the game's outcome, with four converted penalties reducing a deficit leading to a draw and one of these draws followed by another penalty for a win. In 36 matches, the converted penalty was the first goal, including Germany's first match against world champions Brazil in May 1963. Of these matches, the opponents managed to draw three times and win the match five times. On seven occasions, the converted penalty was the only goal of the match.

Significant penalties include the converted penalty by Herbert Burdenski in Germany's first match after World War II, as well as the penalty converted in the 1990 FIFA World Cup Final, which was taken by Andreas Brehme instead of originally-intended kicker Lothar Matthäus. This made Germany the first team to be given a penalty in two World Cup finals, after becoming the first team to concede a penalty in a FIFA World Cup final in 1974. Germany's 1990 World Cup quarter-final victory also saw the converted penalty being the only goal of the match.

In total, Germany converted 51 penalties in friendly matches, 18 in European Championship qualifiers, 11 in World Cup qualifiers and 10 in World Cup matches.

Eleven opposition goalkeepers faced a German penalty twice. Of these penalties, Germany only failed to score either against Alan Fettis of Northern Ireland. John Bonello (Malta) and Borislav Mihaylov (Bulgaria) were each able to save one of the two penalties.

Germany have been given the most penalties by Italian and Swiss referees (eleven each), with the Swiss referees officiating just over half as many matches as the Italians (55 vs. 109). Additionally, two of the three German referees who led a match of the German team gave a penalty for Germany. In both cases, the penalties were not decisive to the match as both ended 5–1: once in favour of the England amateur team and once for the German team against Croatia. Italian Nicola Rizzoli is the only referee to have awarded three penalties for the German team, including two in the same match; he also gave one penalty against the side. Nine other referees have given Germany two penalties.

Penalty shoot-outs 
Germany have been involved in eight penalty shoot-outs, six of which were won and two lost. Germany and Argentina are the only sides that have won four shoot-outs at World Cups, but Germany is the only team ever to participate in this many World Cup shoot-outs with a 100 percent win rate. Consequently, Argentina's only defeat in a penalty shoot-out at a World Cup was against Germany. The most successful penalty takers in shoot-outs for Germany are Andreas Brehme, Pierre Littbarski, Lothar Matthäus and Olaf Thon, with two penalties converted each. Harald Schumacher is the most successful goalkeeper in shoot-outs, with four penalties saved. Sepp Maier (1976) and Eike Immel (1988) are the only goalkeepers who could not save a single penalty in a shoot-out. On four occasions, all German takers were successful in a shoot-out, and in three of these cases only four German kickers were required before the match was won. Even in Germany's two lost shoot-outs, the fifth kicker was not required to take a penalty. In two cases (1982 and 1996), an additional sixth German taker secured a shoot-out victory, while in 2016 this was achieved by the ninth kicker.

Sending off 
So far, 25 German players have been sent off in a match, five of which were yellow-red cards from 1991. The first player to be sent off was Hans Kalb, in a match against Uruguay on 3 June 1928 at the 1928 Olympics; he thus also became the first captain of the German team to be sent off. Jérôme Boateng was the first player to be dismissed on his international debut,  on 10 October 2009 in Moscow against Russia. The first German player to be shown a red card in a World Cup match (used since 1970) was Thomas Berthold on 21 June 1986, in a quarter-final game against Mexico. Berthold was also the first German international to be sent off twice. Jérôme Boateng, Carsten Ramelow and Christian Wörns were also each sent off twice. Boateng was the last player to be sent off, being dismissed on 23 June 2018 in a World Cup group stage match against Sweden. Ron-Robert Zieler was the first German goalkeeper to be sent off, on 15 August 2012 against Argentina.

The most players to be sent off in a single Germany match is three, against Uruguay on 3 June 1928: the German players Hans Kalb and Richard Hofmann were dismissed, in addition to the Uruguayan José Nasazzi.

Two German players have been sent off after being brought on as a substitute: Ulf Kirsten and Bastian Schweinsteiger.

Team

Results

Frequency of match results 
2–1 is the most frequent scoreline in favour of the Germany national team, with 88 matches (8.94%) ending like this. This is followed by a scoreline of 1–1 (86 matches) and 1–0 (85 matches). 1–0 was also the score for Germany's World Cup final victories in 1990 and 2014, and their Confedetations Cup victory in 2017. 2–1 was the score for their World Cup final win in 1974 and their European Championship final victories in 1980 and 1996. 2–0 is the next most common result (81 matches). Of the matches lost by Germany, 0–1 is the most frequent result (46 matches), followed by 1–2 (44 matches). 51 of Germany's matches ended scoreless (5.18%), and they have played a total of 341 matches (34.65%) without conceding, seven of which came consecutively between 2016 and 2017.

Biggest wins

Fifteen consecutive wins in all competitive matches (world record)

Highest-scoring draws

Biggest defeats

Attendance 
There have been thirteen matches played involving the German team with at least 100,000 spectators. Only two of these matches place in Germany. Two matches took place at a neutral venue, both at the Estadio Azteca. The majority of these matches took place when standing room was allowed at international matches and the stadiums thus had higher capacities. Currently, there are only two stadiums worldwide with a capacity of at least 100,000 spectators.

Match statistics

Consideration of extensions and penalty shoot-outs 
Matches that were decided in extra time are scored according to their result.

The Germany national team partook in seven penalty shoot-outs at World Cup finals and European Championships, winning six and losing one. They also took part in a shoot-out during the Four Nations Tournament in 1988, which they lost.

The matches which were decided by penalty shoot-out are counted below as draws. The goals scored in shoot-outs are not taken into account for overall goals scored, goals conceded or goal difference.

Opponents to continental federations

Match type 
UEFA only evaluates the matches that have been played in a final tournament as European Championship matches.

For this reason, the four European Championship quarter-finals of 1972 and 1976 are considered European Championship qualifiers.

All international matches 
The Germany national team has played against 91 different national teams. In Europe, only Norway (95) and Sweden (95) have played against more different national teams.

Below are:

 9 of the currently 56 national teams of the CAF
 10 of the 47 national teams of the AFC
 1 of the currently 11 national teams of the OFC
 50 of the other 54 national teams of UEFA (no matches have so far against Andorra, Kosovo and Montenegro)
 4 of the currently 41 national teams of CONCACAF
 9 of the 10 national teams of CONMEBOL (no match has been played against Venezuela)
 8 former national teams (in italics), of which 6 belonged to UEFA at the time of the last matches.

Denmark, Finland, Israel, Russia, San Marino and Cyprus suffered their highest losses against Germany, Croatia and Luxembourg against Germany and England, Brazil against Germany and Uruguay and Estonia against Germany and Finland such as Hungary against Germany, England and the Netherlands. Germany was the first international opponent in Slovakia in 1939.

The Germany national team has the following balance sheets (as of June 14, 2022):

 green background = positive balance (number of wins higher than that of defeats) 
 yellow background = balance balanced (number of wins as high as that of defeats)
 red background = balance negative (number of defeats higher than the wins)

Venue 
Germany hosted in 1974 and 2006, the World Cup, in 1988 European Championship and in 2005 Confederations Cup. The matches played in the context of these tournaments of the Germany national team count as home matches, the matches against tournament hosts accordingly as away matches. Likewise, the international matches in Vienna after Anschluss Austria, more pDrawely 3 matches in the years 1940, 1941 and 1942 below as home matches. The meeting in Saarbrücken against the Saarland in the context of the WC Qualification 1954 counts as an away match.

Home venues

Competition records

FIFA World Cup 
 

*Denotes draws include knockout matches decided via penalty shoot-out.
**Gold background colour indicates that the tournament was won.
***Red border colour indicates tournament was held on home soil.

UEFA European Championship 
1960–1988 as 
1992–present as 

*Denotes draws include knockout matches decided via penalty shoot-out.
**Gold background colour indicates that the tournament was won.
***Red border colour indicates tournament was held on home soil.

FIFA Confederations Cup 

*Denotes draws including knockout matches decided via penalty shoot-out.
**Gold background colour indicates that the tournament was won.
***Red border colour indicates tournament was held on home soil.
Note All tournaments from 1950 to 1990 inclusively were competed as West Germany.

UEFA Nations League 

*Denotes draws including knockout matches decided via penalty shoot-out.
**Gold background colour indicates that the tournament was won.
***Red border colour indicates tournament was held on home soil.

Men's honours

Major competitions 
FIFA World Cup
 Champions (4): 1954, 1974, 1990, 2014
 Runners-up (4): 1966, 1982, 1986, 2002
 Third place (4): 1934, 1970, 2006, 2010
 Fourth place (1): 1958

UEFA European Championship
 Champions (3): 1972, 1980, 1996
 Runners-up (3): 1976, 1992, 2008
 Third place (3): 1988, 2012, 2016

Summer Olympic Games
 Gold Medal (1): 1976
 Silver Medal (2): 1980, 2016
 Bronze Medal (3): 1964, 1972, 1988
 Fourth place (1): 1952

FIFA Confederations Cup
 Champions (1): 2017
 Third place (1): 2005

Women's honours

Major competitions 
FIFA Women's World Cup
 Champions (2): 2003, 2007
 Runners-up (1): 1995
 Fourth place (2): 1991, 2015

UEFA Women's Championship
 Champions (8): 1989, 1991, 1995, 1997, 2001, 2005, 2009, 2013
 Runners-up (1): 2022
 Fourth place (1): 1993

Summer Olympic Games
 Gold Medal (1): 2016
 Bronze Medal (3): 2000, 2004, 2008

Notes

References 

Germany national football team results
Germany national football team records and statistics
National association football team records and statistics